Joseph Quincy Mitchell (July 27, 1908 – May 24, 1996) was an American writer best known for his works of creative nonfiction he published in The New Yorker. His work primarily consists of character studies, where he used detailed portraits of people and events to highlight the commonplace of the world, especially in and around New York City.

Biography

Early life 
Mitchell was born on July 27, 1908 on his maternal grandfather's farm near Fairmont, North Carolina and was the son of Averette Nance and Elizabeth Amanda Parker Mitchell. He had five younger siblings: Jack, Elizabeth, Linda, Harry, and Laura. Mitchell's father, a fourth generation cotton and tobacco farmer, was a Southerner steeped in the values of the Baptist church, and he tried to instill these values into his children. As his eldest son, Averette hoped that Mitchell would someday take over the family business and continue the family's legacy.

Mitchell's adventurous personality as a child contradicted his father's staunch work ethic and traditional Southern values. From a young age, Mitchell was deeply touched by nature. He loved to climb trees, and it was one of the few activities that allowed an outlet for his young imagination to develop. He also tended to escape to the swamps surrounding his father's property as often as he could, as it allowed him to feel connected to the world around him. Mitchell stated, "the water mesmerized me; everything in it interested me, still or moving, dead or alive."

Education 
Mitchell left home and attended college at the University of North Carolina at Chapel Hill in 1925. As a journalism major, he was "a solid if not superior student," and he was successful in humanities courses such as history, language, music, and literature and explored classes in nearly every subject. Aside from his studies, he began writing for the campus literary magazine and newspaper as a sports reporter. Because he had no aptitude for mathematics, he was unable to successfully finish his degree.  He left college and moved to New York City in 1929.

Family 
On February 27, 1932, he married Therese Jacobsen, a reporter and photographer. They remained married until her death in 1980, and had two daughters, Nora and Elizabeth.

Mental health 
Joseph Mitchell suffered from depression all of his life. An unsteady relationship with his father and his lack of belonging in his two homes of North Carolina and New York left Mitchell isolated and listless for much of his life. He lived in an era of psychology that focused purely on anxiety, and doctors regarded depression as a severe side effect of existing anxiety. However, symptoms of this condition did not clearly manifest in his life until late in his career. Many of Mitchell's coworkers, as well as his biographer, Thomas Kunkel, tell of the toll the subjects of his works had on him, specifically his greatest subject, Joe Gould. Mitchell once remarked to Washington Post writer David Streitfeld, "You pick someone so close that, in fact, you are writing about yourself. Joe Gould had to leave home because he didn't fit in, the same way I had to leave home because I didn't fit in. Talking to Joe Gould all those years he became me in a way, if you see what I mean." Even with Joe Gould as a way to explore his own reality, Mitchell began to attract characters with similar attributes. In a feature within The New Yorker magazine, Charles McGrath notes that "the critic Stanley Edgar Hyman first pointed out that the people Mitchell wrote about more and more resembled himself: loners, depressives, nostalgists, haunters of the waterfront, cherishers of arcane information. The characters in his pieces began to share a similar voice; they all sounded a little like Mitchell."

From 1964 until his death in 1996, Mitchell would go to work at his office on a daily basis, but he never published anything further. Although he struggled to publish, he did write hundreds of pages of manuscripts for several pieces, including his own memoir, which Thomas Kunkel used extensively in writing Mitchell's biography. After he died, his colleague Roger Angell wrote:Each morning, he stepped out of the elevator with a preoccupied air, nodded wordlessly if you were just coming down the hall, and closed himself in his office. He emerged at lunchtime, always wearing his natty brown fedora (in summer, a straw one) and a tan raincoat; an hour and a half later, he reversed the process, again closing the door. Not much typing was heard from within, and people who called on Joe reported that his desktop was empty of everything but paper and pencils. When the end of the day came, he  went home. Sometimes, in the evening elevator, I heard him emit a small sigh, but he never complained, never explained.While his battle with mental illness continued in the workplace, he was known by his family as a dependable and caring father and husband at home. Therese Jacobson and their children, Nora and Elizabeth, retained nothing but fond memories of their father, even though they knew he was struggling in his career.

Death 
In 1995, Mitchell was diagnosed with lung cancer after he began experiencing back pain. The cancer eventually spread and metastasized in his brain. On May 24, 1996, Mitchell died at Columbia-Presbyterian Medical Center in Manhattan at the age of 87. He was laid to rest in Floyd Memorial Cemetery in his hometown of Fairmont, North Carolina next to his wife. On his gravestone his daughters inscribed a quote from Shakespeare's seventy-third sonnet, one of his favorite lines in literature: "Bare ruined choirs, where late the sweet birds sang."

Further reading 
For more information on Mitchell's biography and daily life, see Thomas Kunkel's Man in Profile: Joseph Mitchell of The New Yorker (2015).

Career 

Mitchell came to New York City in 1929, at the age of 21, with the ambition of becoming a political reporter. He worked for such newspapers as The World, the New York Herald Tribune, and the New York World-Telegram, at first covering crime and then doing interviews, profiles, and character sketches. In 1931, he took a break from journalism to work on a freighter that sailed to Leningrad and brought back pulp logs to New York City. He returned to journalism later that year and continued to write for New York newspapers until he was hired by St. Clair McKelway at The New Yorker in 1938. He remained with the magazine until his death in 1996.

His book Up in the Old Hotel collects the best of his writing for The New Yorker, and his earlier book My Ears Are Bent collects the best of his early journalistic writing, which he omitted from Up in the Old Hotel. Mitchell's last book was his empathetic account of the Greenwich Village street character and self-proclaimed historian Joe Gould's extravagantly disguised case of writer's block, published as Joe Gould's Secret (1964). Mitchell served on the board of directors of the Gypsy Lore Society, was one of the founders of the South Street Seaport Museum, was involved with the Friends of Cast-Iron Architecture, and served five years on the New York City Landmarks Preservation Commission. In August 1937, he placed third in a clam-eating tournament on Block Island by eating 84 cherrystone clams. In 2008, The Library of America selected Mitchell's story "Execution" for inclusion in its two-century retrospective of American True Crime. The February 11, 2013 edition of The New Yorker includes a previously unpublished portion of Mitchell's unfinished autobiography entitled "Street Life: Becoming Part of the City."

Central themes

Character study 
Seen throughout Joseph Mitchell's oeuvre is his distinct focus on the underdog characters, or the laymen of NYC, and the focus on unexpected characters. For example, Mazie is a central focus for a New Yorker article bearing her name.“Mazie” first appears in the print edition of the December 21, 1940 issue of The New Yorker. The piece, later published in Mitchell's collection of essays in Up in the Old Hotel, creates and canonizes Mazie, a woman who worked in the ticket booth of The Venice theater. Mitchell's meticulous reporting skills result in an account of Mazie complete with factual details, close observation, and direct quotations. Critics believe Mazie resembles Mitchell himself: they share an affinity for remembering small facts and giving attention to the overlooked members of society.  Mazie P. Gordon is tough and blunt. Detective Kain of the Oak Street Police Station declares that Mazie “has the roughest tongue and the softest heart in the Third Precinct. In Mitchell's profile, her life is confined to the ticket booth of the movie theater where she socializes with “bums” that come and go from the surrounding flophouses. Direct conversations detail her interactions with her community.  

Mitchell was open to taking on the challenge of profiling the female central character of Mazie. The writing process was challenging until his central character would give him “the revealing remark.” The 1938 World Telegram description of Mazie P. Gordon reveals she was known as “Miss Mazie” to the men she interacted with around the Venice Theatre. She is blonde, kind, and has exaggerated hair and makeup. Two years later, when Mitchell profiled Mazie in The New Yorker, some critics called Mitchell an anthropologist in his description. Mazie becomes more than just a blonde and kind woman, and instead is shown to be complex and strong-willed. Mitchell's close observation of Mazie set a new standard for writers and reporters. Mitchell's curiosity without judgement inspired writers to continue Mazie's legacy.

The character of Mazie is popularized by the novel Saint Mazie by Jami Attenberg. She encountered “Mazie” through Mitchell's collection of his magazine pieces, and used Mitchell's profile to fashion Mazie into a fictional character. Ultimately, Mazie archetypes Mitchell's distinct characteristics that intrigue readers. Much of this intrigue, for all of Mitchell's underdog characters, comes from the access he provides into the lives of the people that the readers of the New Yorker wouldn't normally meet. The Rivermen, for instance, would be irrelevant people to most of NYC citizens until Mitchell brings them into focus for the readers. In yet another way, Rats on the Waterfront (Thirty-Two Rats From Casablanca) tells a compelling story where the central character is not even human. Mitchell's focus on these unlikely characters gives his nonfiction a very distinct character.

Time and passing 
The term "Mitchell time" was coined by novelist Thomas Beller to describe the gauzy effect in Mitchell's writings. He goes on to further describe Mitchell's temporal dimension as a "strange and twilight place where a density of historical fact and the feeling of whole eras fading from view are sharply juxtaposed with the senses of cinematic immediacy related in the present tense." Mitchell's distinctive voice can be seen in many, if not all, of his works. The most notable example of "Mitchell time" is seen in the story Mr. Hunter's Grave where the narrative tells of the overlapping of many eras occurring in one small location.

Landscape study 
Joseph Mitchell was born in North Carolina, yet throughout the majority of his writing career he centered his writing around New York City and its subjects. He brought a distinct and unique style of reporting to NYC that stemmed from his Southern upbringing. Mitchell was said to have brought the ultimate Southern courtesy of accepting “people on their own terms”. Although he was a Brooklyn police reporter at first, by the time he moved to work in Harlem he began to connect with the “raffish side” of the NYC borough and it was here that his deep affection for NYC and its people started to blossom. Scholars claim that Mitchell's 1959 collection entitled The Bottom of the Harbor is his best and most “elegiac account of New York”. It is here that Mitchell references not only the underdog characters of NYC, but also the underdog places - such as the Fulton Fish Market; a reoccurring place of study in this water based collection. For example, Dragger Captain is “the story of an old salt in the fleet out of Stonington, Connecticut, that supplies the Fulton Fish Market with flounder”.  But it is once again Mitchell's character selection in The Bottom of the Harbor that allows him to portray NYC in his signature matte style. The subjects "are mainly old men, they are custodians of memory, their stories a link with the history of a city that has always been mercantile at heart." Additionally, Mitchell liked to visit the Edgewater Cemetery, which was the inspiration for one of his most famous articles - Mr. Hunter’s Grave. From North Carolina he “brought an interest in wildflowers” and these flowers “could be found most easily in overgrown cemeteries around New York City.”  Mitchell managed to discover these quaint everyday places as he would often set off to work in his New Yorker office, but instead, he would carry on walking, taking in NYC and its landscape. Indeed, much of Mitchell's work was conceived due to his enchanted meandering of NYC where he “walked the city incessantly . . . little escaped his notice”

Selected works

"Up in the Old Hotel" 
In Joseph Mitchell's feature "Up in the Old Hotel'," Mitchell explores the Fulton Fish Market of New York, specifically Sloppy Louie's Restaurant. He features the owner of the space, and explores the character in full before adventuring up the old elevator shaft with Louie and exploring the abandoned and sectioned-off old hotel space.

In his opening, Mitchell surveys the personality of the man he has this experience with, setting the mood for the entire piece. Louie is an Italian immigrant that worked for years in restaurants around the city until The Crash of 1929, when the property that is now his restaurant finally came into his price range. It was never the flashiest or nicest building, but it was near the market and was plenty successful in housing a small restaurant. Louie is constantly experimenting with his dishes, making his shop the place to stop and try a new kind of fish, or other seafood. Growing up in a small Italian fishing village himself, he does not shy away from different flavors and possibilities with his fish. He's a humble and gentlemanly man that adds an air of propriety and humility to everything he does; he works the same as any of his employees to keep his restaurant running, doing the same jobs, and always keeps a white cloth folded over his arm for the sake of class, even when he's only running the register. He maintains relationships with his regular customers, like Mitchell, and fosters business relationships with the fishermen that bring their catches to the dock for sale at the Fulton Market.

"Up in the Old Hotel" isn't just the story of Louie, or Sloppy Louie's, but about the closed-off elevator shaft that not even Louie has ever traveled up into. This comes about over breakfast, when Louie tells Mitchell he may need to add extra tables to the second floor of his place to make up for the growing lunch crowds coming in. When Mitchell points out he has four empty floors above them, Louie explains that only the first two floors have stairs to access them, and the rest of the building is closed off. Out of pure curiosity, Mitchell agrees to be the man who will go up to the unused four floors with Louie for the first time, when the opportunity arises. The elevator shaft, the equipment, nor the space above has been used or even really touched since it was shut out, making it a particularly risky endeavor for both of the men, and upon realizing it is safe to use, they travel up to the old hotel that hasn't been seen by anyone in  decades.

Up on the first blocked floor, the two men find the remains of what was once a high-end hotel, finding bureaus with playing cards, hangers, mirrors, and the sign to the reading room. The environment itself was depressing to Mitchell, and he decided the leave immediately, so neither of the men bothered to go up to the floor above them. This feature by Mitchell really clings to his notions of the passage of time, and the coming change in New York, and the rest of the world.

"Mr. Hunter's Grave" 

"Mr. Hunter's Grave" was published by The New Yorker on September 22, 1956. To this day, the piece remains one of Mitchell's biggest journalistic successes—with an array of positive reviews. "Mr. Hunter's Grave" was republished in one of Mitchell's collections, Up In The Old Hotel, which was  released in 1992.  The article is based on an encounter Joseph Mitchell had with an African-American man named George Hunter, who lived in Sandy Ground, a black community in Staten Island, one that is credited with being the oldest, established, free black community in the United States.

This article in particular begins with what one could consider a “typical Mitchell day” and allows for the reader to get closer to Mitchell in a sense. One day, Mitchell wakes up, admittedly feeling stressed form his surroundings, packs a couple sandwiches, and decides to go down to Staten Island to explore the cemeteries. Mitchell walks the reader through a number of cemeteries he enjoys walking through on days like that day, which include places such as “Woodrow Methodist Church on Woodrow Road in the Woodrow community, or to the cemetery of St. Luke’s Episcopal Church on the Arthur Kill Road in the Rossville community, or to one on the Arthur Kill Road on the outskirts of Rossville” before leading the reader to The South Shore, a more rural part of Staten Island, where trees tend to dominate, and a place where some of the oldest graveyards can be found, (Mitchell). Mitchell continues his exploration of several graveyards, stopping at gravestones, studying them, reading the names off of them, and moving vines and dirt off of certain ones he ponders upon. Mitchell begins to grow weary, preparing to leave the graveyard off of Rossville until he notices a wildflower that catches his attention, drawn to the grave of a Rachel Dissoway, which is when Mitchell is noticed by the rector of the graveyard, Mr. Brock.

The two men discuss Mitchell's interest in wild flowers, particularly Peppergrass, which leads to Mr. Brock telling Mitchell about a cemetery in a black community off of Bloomingdale Road. Mr. Brock gives Mitchell the contact of a Mr. G. Hunter, who is the chairman of trustees of the Methodist Church in the community, Sandy Ground, where Mitchell would like to go look for Peppergrass. Mitchell, using the information given to him by Mr. Brock, contacts Mr. Hunter, and sets up a time to meet the man at his house that coming Saturday morning, for him to explore Sandy Ground. 
On Saturday morning, Mitchell arrives at Mr. Hunter's home, where he is greeted by Mr. Hunter, who at the time of his arrival is icing a cake. In the time while Mitchell is at Mr. Hunter's home, Mitchell learns a great deal about the history of Sandy Ground. While in the kitchen, the two men discuss multiple concepts—such as the wildflower pokeweed that the older women of Sandy Ground, including Mr. Hunter's mother, believed that they root had healing properties, even though others just generally regard them as poisonous. Following this, there's commentary about what kind of wood Mr. Hunter's house is built of, and talk about how much he despises flies while the two men are sitting on the porch, (as well as a discussion about the history of Sandy Ground, which started due to the wanting of oysters). Following the incident with the flies, Mr. Hunter and Mitchell begin their trip to the graveyard.

On the way to the graveyard, Mitchell discusses more discussion  regarding Mr. Hunter's family and himself—such as the fact that Mr. Hunter wasn't born in the South, but his mother was; more so, his mother was a slave from Virginia, and her mother before her. After Mr. Hunter's mother's slavery days, she moved to Brooklyn, where she met and married his father, although, after his father served a sentence, the family moved to Sandy Ground, hoping to get work by harvesting oysters. After his father's death, Mr. Hunter's mother married a man from Sandy Ground, who Mr. Hunter did not much care for, but goes into the history of his step family nonetheless. Mr. Hunter then goes into discuss how he too became a drunk, and the several jobs he had such as a bricklayer and a business owner, before marrying his first wife. Mr. Hunter reveals that he was married twice, and lost both his wives, he also reveals that he had a son who died. After this revelation, the two men enter the cemetery. The men discuss different roots, some of which Mitchell is familiar with, and one of which he is not, until they come across a grave that Mr. Hunter says is his Uncle's. Mr. Hunter, while Mitchell explores a little more, works on getting the vines off the gravestone, so the two men can better observe it. Following this, the two men stop at a number of different graves, with Mr. Hunter narrating short life stories of each individual they tend to stop at. The routine of stopping, narrating, and continuing comes to a cease upon the two men reaching Mr. Hunter's plot, where he will actually not be buried due to a mishap—of which Mr. Hunter explains clearly, and emotionally, admitting it outraged him. Taking two steps further, Mr. Hunter shows Mitchell where he will be buried in all actuality, stating, “'Ah, well, (…), it won’t make any difference'” ending the article, (Mitchell).

The article, like many others did acquire a level of scrutiny following the publication of a Mitchell biography written by Thomas Kunkel in 2015. Kunkel's biography brought to light several fascinating facts about Joseph Mitchell's life, however, some of the information provided from it opened up a wormhole, specifically the revelation that certain pieces of Mitchell's articles were fabricated and the period of time of which the events took place shortened. Many critics it appears were distraught, such as Michael Rosenwald, a writer for the Columbia Journalism Review. Following the publication of the book, Rosenwald wrote an article entitled, “‘I Wish This Guy Hadn’t Written This Book’”. In this article, Rosenwald explores his own relationship with Mitchell -- stating how the man influenced both himself and other generations of writers and how his favorite article by him is "Mr. Hunter's Grave", then goes into his disappointment about what was put in the Kunkel biography, stating, “For me, learning these things was like a kid discovering his favorite baseball player whacked long home runs while juicing on steroids” showcasing the betrayal he felt. Rosenwald's article also entails the opinion of another well respected journalist, Gay Talese, who Rosenwald is friends with. Upon reading the novel, and hearing about it himself, Rosenwald records that Talese said something along the lines of, “'To hear that one of the guys I grew up admiring did things I don’t think I’d want to be accused of doing, it’s troubling and sad'”.

"Dragger Captain" 
In January 1947 "Dragger Captain" appeared in The New Yorker in two parts. In this profile Mitchell talks to and follows 47-year-old Ellery Thompson who is captain of a dragger boat, named Eleanor. The Eleanor works out of Stonington port in Connecticut.  Mitchell chooses Ellery Thompson as he is “the most skillful and the most respected of the captain in the Stonington fleet”.  Mitchell and Captain Thompson soon find that they have compatible personalities, thus, allowing Mitchell to accompany Ellery during his drags. Throughout the article we gradually learn more about Ellery as a person and not just a dragger captain. Ellery's brother, Morris, died at sea trying to combat poor sailing conditions to try and make a living. Ellery has to then drag for his own brother's body, giving us an insight as to the reason why Ellery looks upon life “with a droll world-weariness”. But Ellery is also a kind and thoughtful man. For example, unlike other draggers, he keeps the best lobster he catches for himself and his crew. Additionally, when the oceanographers from Yale University sail with him on the Eleanor one day a month he flies an “old Yale pennant”. The article closes with Frank, one of Ellery's two crew mates, telling an interesting folk tale. The story is about Old Chrissy, “an old rascal of a woman that was the head of a gang of Block Island wreckers”. The gig was that Chrissy and her crew would lure ships in “with false lights, & they killed the sailors & the passengers, so there wouldn't be any tales told”. On one occasion she unknowingly lures in her own son's ship. But, she chooses to “clout him on the head. ‘A son’s a son,’ she said, ‘but a wreck’s a wreck”.

“Dragger Captain” was met with much critical acclaim. So much so, that the rights were acquired by Warner Brothers and it was rumored that they were going to “develop it for Gary Cooper”. Thompson was promised 10% of any proceeds by Mitchell. Ultimately though, nothing came of the rumors with Mitchell calling it “studio commissary gossip” and stating that “the only truth in it is that a writer has been assigned to try and work out a script on dragger finishing, using the Profile as background”.

Joe Gould's Secret 
In Joe Gould's Secret (1965), Mitchell expanded upon two earlier New Yorker profiles, “Professor Sea Gull” (1942) and “Joe Gould’s Secret” (1964), concerning Joe Gould, an eccentric bohemian living in New York City. Following Gould's death, Mitchell embarks on a search for the massive book Gould had long claimed to be writing, An Oral History of Our Time. Mitchell soon learns that the purportedly nine-million-word work of oral history does not exist. However, he finds that Gould is a popular and central figure within a number of New York circles. Extending Mitchell's abiding concerns with the anti-hero and the New York landscape, Joe Gould’s Secret also captures the essence of Gould's non-existent oral history by preserving the life and voice of Joe Gould. 

Gould's writing is digressive and self-referential; however, Mitchell's writing in Joe Gould’s Secret diverges from his previous works. Mitchell often speaks in first person while offering personal accounts and memories revolving around the plot. Furthermore, Gould's nonexistent “Oral History” is an attempt to capture the voices of the plebeian class, or the anti-heroes. Mitchell's entire work, especially Joe Gould’s Secret, captures the selfsame essence. His work often revolves around character study, in which he captures Joe Gould's profile.  Gould struggles with writing and rewriting the first few chapters of his “Oral History” because of writer's block. Ironically, Mitchell, himself, is struggling with a degree of writer's block in which he was unable, later in life, to continue his previous writing output.

Critical reception 
Critical reviews of Mitchell's works are, almost overwhelmingly, positive. Many critics have labeled Mitchell "the best reporter in the country" and marked him as the writer with whom "any writer with aspirations in literary journalism...has to reckon with," and the writer that "transform[ed] the craft of reporting into art". William Zinsser states that Mitchell serves as the "primary textbook" for "nonfiction writers of any generation". Critics credit Mitchell's strength as a writer to his "skills as an interviewer, photographic representation of his characters and their speech, deadpan humor, and graceful, unadorned prose style". Critics also note that it is Mitchell's "respect and compassion for his subjects" that allows him to explore uncomfortable themes like "mortality, change, and the past". Throughout Mitchell's career, he has been praised for his "ear for dialogue and eye for detail, genuine interest in the lives of his subjects, rhythmic, simple prose".  For many critics, Mitchell serves as the model writer for "generations of nonfiction writers" In the latter part of Mitchell's career, critics began to note that the tone of his writing had become "increasingly nostalgic" but that he retained his "earthly sense of humor and obvious delight in making new discoveries about New York". One notable literary critic, Noel Perrin, notes that "Mitchell described the life and even the very soul of New York as perhaps no one else ever has". There are critics who question Mitchell's legacy as a journalist because of his tendency to "cross a line" between fiction and nonfiction, often "shaping the facts" of his stories to offer "the core 'truth' of the story" rather than "its interior factuality". One critic asks, "knowing [Mitchell] fabricated and embellished, how should we view his legacy?"

In popular culture
In 2000, Joe Gould's Secret, a feature film directed by Stanley Tucci and written by Howard A. Rodman, was released. It focuses on the relationship between Mitchell (played by Tucci) and Joe Gould (Ian Holm) during the 1940s.

Mitchell is portrayed in The Blackwell Series, an indie computer game series revolving around paranormal themes. In the second game of the series, the player encounters Mitchell during the prolonged writer's block of his later years. In the third game of the series, the player encounters ghosts of both Mitchell and Joe Gould.

Mitchell is referenced by the editor of the Baltimore Sun, Gus Haynes, in the last episode of the HBO drama The Wire. Steve Earle's song "Down Here Below", from Washington Square Serenade, mentions Mitchell directly saying, “I saw Joe Mitchell's ghost on a downtown 'A' train. He just rides on forever now that the Fulton Fish Market's shut down."

Bibliography

Collections from prior newspaper works

Collections of work from The New Yorker 

)

All works from The New Yorker

1931–1939 

Comment With E.B. White Comment (January 16, 1931)
Comment With E.B. White Comment (August 12, 1932)
High Hats' Harold D. Winney & Joseph Mitchell The Talk of the Town (June 9, 1933)
Reporter at Large They Got Married in Elkton A Reporter at Large (November 3, 1933)
Home Girl Profiles (February 23, 1934)
Reporter at Large. Bar and Grill. A Reporter at Large (November 13, 1936)
Mr. Grover A. Whalen and the Midway A Reporter at Large (June 25, 1937)
The Kind Old Blonde Fiction (May 27, 1938)
Reporter at Large A Reporter at Large (August 19, 1938)
Mrs. Bright and Shining Star Chibby Fiction (October 28, 1938)
I Couldn't Dope it Out Fiction (December 2, 1938)
Christmas Story A Reporter at Large (December 16, 1938)
Obituary of a Gin Mill A Reporter at Large (December 30, 1938)
 Downfall of Fascism in Black Ankle County Fiction (January 6, 1939)
The Little Brutes! A Reporter at Large (February 3, 1939)
Dignity. The Talk of the Town (February 10, 1939)
All You Can Hold For Five Bucks. A Reporter at Large (April 7, 1939)
Plans The Talk of the Town (April 14, 1939)
Hotfoot The Talk of the Town (April 21, 1939)
The Catholic Street A Reporter at Large (April 21, 1939)
Houdini's Picnic A Reporter at Large (April 28, 1939)
More Plans The Talk of the Town (April 28, 1939)
Uncle Dockery and the Independent Bull Fiction (May 5, 1939)
Windsor's Friends With Russell Maloney The Talk of the Town (May 19, 1939)
The Hospital Was All Right Fiction (May 19, 1939)
A Mess of Clams A Reporter at Large (July 21, 1939)
Goodbye, Shirley Temple Fiction (September 8, 1939)
Mr. Barbee's Terrapin A Reporter at Large (October 20, 1939)
The Markee Profiles (October 27, 1939)
Sunday Night Was a Dangerous Night Fiction (November 24, 1939)

1940–1949 

I Blame it All on Mamma Fiction (January 5, 1940)
Santa Claus Smith of Riga, Latvia, Europe A Reporter at Large (March 22, 1940)
The Old House at Home Profiles (April 14, 1940)
Lady Olga Profiles (July 26, 1940)
Evening with a Gifted Child A Reporter at Large (August 23, 1940)
Second-Hand Hot Spots Profiles (September 13, 1940)
Mazie Profiles (December 14, 1940)
New Resident. With Eugene Kinkead & Harold Ross The Talk of the Town (January 24, 1941)
Mr. Colborne's Profanity-Exterminators Profiles (April 25, 1941)
But There is No Sound A Reporter at Large (September 12, 1941)
The Tooth Profiles (October 24, 1941)
King of the Gypsies Profiles (August 7, 1942)
Professor Sea Gull Profiles (December 4, 1942)
Comment Comment (April 23, 1943)
A Spism and a Spasm Profiles (July 16, 1943)
The Mayor of the Fish Market Profiles (December 24, 1943)
Rebate. With F. Whitz The Talk of the Town (February 25, 1944)
Thirty-Two Rats from Casablanca A Reporter at Large (April 21, 1944)
Coffins! Undertakers! Hearses! Funeral Parlors! A Reporter at Large (November 17, 1944)
Solution. (March 2, 1945)
Mr. Flood's Party A Reporter at Large (July 27, 1945)
Dragger Captain. Profiles (December 27, 1946)
Dragger Captain: Professors Abroad Profiles (January 3, 1947)
Incidental Intelligence With Brendan Gill The Talk of the Town (August 15, 1947)
The Mohawks in High Steel A Reporter at Large (September 9, 1949)

1950–1964 

The Bottom of the Harbor Profiles (December 29, 1950)
The Cave Profiles (June 20, 1952)
Comment With Brendan Gill Comment (May 6, 1955)
The Beautiful Flower Profiles (May 27, 1955)
Three Men With Brendan Gill The Talk of the Town (April 20, 1956)
Mr. Hunter's Grave Profiles (September 14, 1956)
Observer With John McCarten The Talk of the Town (November 14, 1958)
The Rivermen Profiles (March 27, 1959)
Joe Gould's Secret - I Profiles (September 11, 1964)
Joe Gould's Secret Profiles (September 18, 1964)

2000–2015 

Takes Takes (May 28, 2000)
Street Life Personal History (February 3, 2013)
Days in the Branch Personal History (November 24, 2014)
A Place of Pasts Personal History (February 9, 2015)

Notes

External links

1908 births
1996 deaths
20th-century American journalists
20th-century American male writers
20th-century American non-fiction writers
American male journalists
Burials in North Carolina
Deaths from brain cancer in the United States
Deaths from lung cancer in New York (state)
New York Herald Tribune people
People from Fairmont, North Carolina
The New Yorker people
The New Yorker staff writers
Members of the American Academy of Arts and Letters